This is a page of the events in the year 1943 in Belgium.

Incumbents
Monarch: Leopold III (prisoner)
Prime Minister: Hubert Pierlot (in exile)
Head of the occupying Military Administration in Belgium and Northern France: Alexander von Falkenhausen
Head of the administrative staff of the Occupation: Eggert Reeder

Events
 13 January – Cardinal van Roey issues a pastoral letter condemning terrorism.
 17 January – Léon Degrelle declares that Walloons are ethnically Germanic.
 20 January – Solo airstrike on the Gestapo's Brussels headquarters by Jean de Selys Longchamps.
 27 February – 750 Belgian police officers and gendarmes placed in detention by the occupying forces.
 7 March – Decree obliging students to spend six months as labourers.
 10 March – Decree confiscating church bells to be melted down for metal.
 15 March – Cardinal van Roey issues a pastoral letter condemning the seizure of church bells.
 5 April – Americans bomb Mortsel, killing over a thousand civilians.
 19 April – Members of the Resistance briefly stop a deportation train carrying Jewish prisoners to Auschwitz concentration camp.
 20 April – Resistance attack on the office for conscription of compulsory labour destroys a large part of their files.
 16 July – Honoré Van Waeyenbergh, Rector of the Catholic University of Leuven, sentenced to eighteen months imprisonment for refusing to give the occupying forces access to university enrolment records.
 6 August – Occupying forces confiscate 60% of Belgian textile stock.
 7 September – Bombing of Brussels destroys over a thousand buildings.
 9 November – Resistance distribute an uncensored counterfeit edition of Le Soir
 6 December – Occupying forces requisition 129,000 tonnes of agricultural produce.

Arts and architecture
Performances
 17 March – First performance of Georges Sion's comedy La Matrone d'Ephèse in the Palace of Fine Arts, Brussels.

Births
 6 March – Noël Devisch, businessman
 23 March – Marva Mollet, singer 
 5 April – Miet Smet, politician
 14 April – Norbert De Cuyper, politician
 25 April – Jean-Jacques Cassiman, geneticist
 3 June – André Ernotte, film director (died 1999)
 2 July – Walter Godefroot, cyclist
 5 July – André Smets, politician (died 2019)
 1 September – Claude De Bruyn, road safety advocate (died 2020)
 1 October – Raymond Langendries, politician
 5 October – Josly Piette, politician
 1 November – Salvatore Adamo, singer
 25 November – Victor Albert, politician (died 2005)
 1 December – Danny Huwé, journalist (died 1989)

Deaths
 27 January – Louis Fonsny, collaborationist newspaper editor.
 15 April – Paul Colin (born 1895), collaborationist art critic
 10 May – Arnaud Fraiteur (born 1924), resistance fighter
 16 August – Jean de Selys Longchamps (born 1912), fighter pilot
 8 October – Gustave De Smet (born 1877), painter

References

 
1940s in Belgium